Yevgeny Leonidovich Krinov (3 March 1906 – 2 January 1984), D.G.S., was a Soviet Russian astronomer and geologist, born in Otyassy village in the Morshansky District of the Tambov Governorate  of the Russian Empire. Krinov was a renowned meteorite researcher; the mineral Krinovite, discovered in 1966, was named after him.

Scientific work 

From 1926 through 1930 Yevgeny Krinov worked in the meteor division of the Mineralogy Museum of the Soviet Academy of Sciences. During this period he conducted research into the Tunguska event under the supervision of Leonid Kulik. Krinov took part in the longest expedition to the Tunguska site in the years 1929–1930 as an astronomer. The data that was gathered during this expedition became the basis for his 1949 monograph (in Russian) called The Tunguska Meteorite.

In 1975, Yevgeny Krinov ordered the burning of 1500 negatives from a 1938 expedition by Leonid Kulik to the Tunguska event as part of an effort to dispose of hazardous nitrate film. Positive imprints were preserved for further studies in the Russian city of Tomsk.

Science awards 
 1961 - Doctor honoris causa awarded by Soviet Academy of Sciences
 1971 - Leonard Medal

Legacy
A minor planet, 2887 Krinov, discovered in 1977 by Soviet astronomer Nikolai Stepanovich Chernykh, is named after him.

Selected bibliography 
 1947 Spectral Reflective Capacity of Natural Formations
 1949 The Tunguska Meteorite (Russian)
 1952 Fundamentals of Meteoritics
 1959 Sikhote-Alin Iron Meteorite Shower, Vol. I (Russian)
 1963 Sikhote-Alin Iron Meteorite Shower, Vol. II (Russian)
 1966 Giant Meteorites

References

External links
 A list of people from Tambov, Russia, briefly mentioning Yevgeny Krinov
 A short biography of Yevgeny Krinov 

1906 births
1984 deaths
Russian astronomers
Soviet astronomers
Russian geologists
Soviet geologists